This is a list of songs recorded and performed by Slade.

Songs

Unreleased songs

Official Remixes

References

Slade
Slade